Roman Molvistov (born February 10, 1981) is a Russian luger who has competed since the 2000s. A natural track luger, he won two medals in the men's doubles event at the FIL European Luge Natural Track Championships with a silver in 2004 and a bronze in 2006.

References
FIL-Luge profile
Natural track European Championships results 1970-2006.

External links
 

1981 births
Living people
Russian male lugers